Emmanuel Adil Anthony is a South Sudanese politician and the governor of Central Equatoria State since June 29th, 2020.

Adil is an ethnic Kakwa. President Kiir appointed Adil as the governor of Yei River State on February 16, 2018, replacing David Lokonga Moses. As governor, Adil said he wanted to restore peace and stability to Yei River State by reconciling with armed groups. Adil reshuffled his cabinet and replaced some county commissioners around June 17th, 2018. Adil supported the peace agreement in August 2018 that aimed to end the South Sudanese Civil War. South Sudanese refugees began returning to Yei River State from the Democratic Republic of the Congo and Uganda at the beginning of 2019. Adil reshuffled his cabinet again on August 22, 2019. Yei River State was dissolved and became part of Central Equatoria State when South Sudan reverted to ten states on February 22, 2020.

Adil was appointed to be the governor of Central Equatoria State on June 29, 2020, as one of the six governors eligible to be appointed by the SPLM under the R-ARCSS. The state did not have a governor from February 22 to June 29.

References 

Sudan People's Liberation Movement politicians
Living people
Year of birth missing (living people)